Robert Jarvis (birth unknown) is a former professional rugby league footballer who played in the 1940s and 50s. He played at club level for the Featherstone Rovers (Heritage № 310).

Club career
Robert Jarvis made his début for the Featherstone Rovers on Saturday 12 November 1949.

References

External links
Search for "Jarvis" at rugbyleagueproject.org

English rugby league players
Featherstone Rovers players
Place of birth missing (living people)
Possibly living people
Year of birth missing (living people)